Richard, Rich, Dick, Dickie, or Dicky Moore may refer to:

Entertainment
 Richard O. Moore (1920–2015), American poet
 Dickie Moore (actor) (1925–2015), American actor, child actor in Our Gang
 Richard Moore (cinematographer) (1925–2009), American cinematographer and founder of Panavision
 Richard Moore (actor) (born 1942), English actor who played Jarvis Skelton on ITV's Emmerdale
 Rich Moore (born 1963), American animation director
 Richard Moore (comics) (born 1966), American comic book writer and creator
 Dicky Moore (born 1978), English guitarist with Scintillate and Scritti Politti
 Richard Moore (Case Closed) (Kogoro Mori), detective in the anime and manga Case Closed
 Father Richard Moore, priest in the film The Exorcism of Emily Rose

Politics
 Richard Moore (governor), first Governor of Bermuda, 1612–1616
 Richard Moore (Irish politician) (1725–1761), Irish Member of Parliament for Clonmel, 1761
 Richard Moore (radical) (1810–1878), English Chartist
 Richard Moore (New Zealand politician) (1849–1936), New Zealand Member of Parliament
 Richard B. Moore (1893–1978), Barbadian civil rights activist and communist
 Richard A. Moore (1914–1995), United States Ambassador to Ireland, 1989–1992
 Richard Moore (Liberal politician) (1931–2019), British journalist and political aide
 Richard T. Moore (born 1943), American politician, former member of the Massachusetts State Senate
 Richard H. Moore (born 1960), American politician, North Carolina State Treasurer
 Richard Lee Moore (born 1971), American politician, North Carolina House of Representatives
 Richard Moore (Australian politician) (1878–1966), Mayor of Kalgoorlie, member of the Western Australian Legislative Council

Religion
 Richard Moore (Archdeacon of Armagh) (fl. 1402), Irish priest
 Richard Channing Moore (1762–1841), American Episcopal Bishop of Virginia
 Richard Moore (Church of Ireland priest) (died 1818), Dean of Emly

Sports
 Dick Moore (cricketer) (1913–2002), English cricketer
 Dickie Moore (ice hockey) (1931–2015), Canadian ice hockey player and Hockey Hall of Fame member
 Richie Moore (born 1945), American basketball player
 Rich Moore (American football) (born 1947), American football player
 Richard Moore (rugby league) (born 1981), English rugby league player
 Rick Moore (cricketer) (born 1989), English cricketer
 Richard Moore (racing driver) (born 1991), racing driver from New Zealand

Other
 Richard Moore (Irish lawyer) (1783–1857), Irish lawyer and judge
 Richard Moore (sailor) (1910–2005), American sailor
 Dick Moore (Royal Navy officer) (1916–2003), British Royal Navy officer awarded the George Cross in World War II
 Richard Moore (engineer) (1923–2012), professor of computer and electrical engineering at the University of Kansas
 Richard W. Moore (born 1952), American lawyer and government official
 Richard Moore (journalist) (1972–2022), British journalist and author
 Richard Moore (diplomat) (born 1963), British diplomat
 Richard V. Moore (1906–1994), American educator and president of Bethune-Cookman College
 Richard Bernard Moore (born 1965), American man on death row in South Carolina

See also
 Freddy Moore (born 1950), singer-songwriter known as Rick "Skogie" Moore
 Rickie D. Moore, theologian
 Richard More (disambiguation)